Aimo-Rhys Heilmann (born October 22, 1974) is a former freestyle swimmer from Germany, who won the bronze medal in the 4 × 200 m Freestyle Relay at the 1996 Summer Olympics in Atlanta, Georgia. He did so alongside Christian Keller, Christian Tröger, and Steffen Zesner. Winner of six German titles (1995-1999), Heilmann won the world title in the 4 × 100 m Freestyle at the 1997 FINA Short Course World Championships.

References 
 

1974 births
Living people
German male swimmers
Olympic swimmers of Germany
Swimmers at the 1996 Summer Olympics
Olympic bronze medalists for Germany
Swimmers from Leipzig
Olympic bronze medalists in swimming
German male freestyle swimmers
Medalists at the FINA World Swimming Championships (25 m)
Medalists at the 1996 Summer Olympics
Goodwill Games medalists in swimming
Competitors at the 1998 Goodwill Games
20th-century German people
21st-century German people